Chegongmiao station, is a station on Line 1, Line 7, Line 9 and Line 11 of the Shenzhen Metro. It is located underneath Shennan Road, at the west of Xiangmihu Road, in Futian District, Shenzhen, China. It is near China Merchants Bank Tower and Donghai Pacific Mall.

It is the first four-line interchange hub in Shenzhen, and the second in mainland China after the Century Avenue station in the Shanghai Metro. The Line 1 platforms opened on 28 December 2004, the Line 11 platforms opened on 28 June 2016 and the Line 7 and Line 9 platforms opened on 28 October 2016.

This station provides cross-platform interchange between Line 7 and Line 9, but not between Line 1 and Line 11.

Station layout

Gallery

Exits

See also 
China Merchants Bank Tower
Laojie station
Hongshuwan South station

References

External links
 Shenzhen Metro Chegongmiao Station (Line 1) (Chinese)
 Shenzhen Metro Chegongmiao Station (Line 1) (English)
 Shenzhen Metro Chegongmiao Station (Line 7) (Chinese)
 Shenzhen Metro Chegongmiao Station (Line 7) (English)
 Shenzhen Metro Chegongmiao Station (Line 9) (Chinese)
 Shenzhen Metro Chegongmiao Station (Line 9) (English)
 Shenzhen Metro Chegongmiao Station (Line 11) (Chinese)
 Shenzhen Metro Chegongmiao Station (Line 11) (English)

Railway stations in Guangdong
Shenzhen Metro stations
Futian District
Railway stations in China opened in 2004
Railway stations located underground in China